Anuradha Bhat is an Indian playback singer who predominantly works in Kannada language films. She has sung over 100 songs for feature films and also sung in various private musical albums .

Early life and background 

Anuradha Bhat was born to Srikrishna Bhat and Gayathri Srikrishna Bhat in Mangalore, Karnataka. Anuradha has a younger sister, Anupama Bhat who is a television host (TV anchor) and actor.

Anuradha Bhat received her primary education from Carmel school and later from premier institutes like Canara College and MSNM Besant PG Institute of Management Studies (both affiliated to Mangalore University)

Career 
Anuradha Bhat has worked in several non-film albums, remix songs, TV serials, children’s songs & rhymes. "Chinnu - Series of Kannada Animated Rhymes" rendered by Anuradha Bhat is popular among the toddlers. also sung & featured in video single "Naa haaduve nimagaagiye"  A compilation of few of her popular songs - “Anuradha Bhat mashup” is another video song that features her. "Navilugari" is yet another non-film song that she has rendered alongside Rajesh Krishnan.

Discography 
This is a partial list of notable films where Anuradha Bhat has worked as a playback singer.

Live performances and concerts 

Anuradha Bhat has performed at various events Hampi Utsav, Mysore Dasara, Yuva Dasara, Mysore Winter Festival, Vishwa Kannada Sammelana  and Bengaluru Ganesh Utsava (BGU)  

She also performed in various countries namely United States of America (USA), London (UK), Netherlands (Europe), Australia, Africa, Singapore, Hong Kong, UAE, Oman, Qatar, Kuwait and Bahrain.

Awards and nominations 

Won
 Karnataka State Film Award for Best Female Playback Singer (2012) presented by the Government of Karnataka for her song "Jnaanajyothi" from the movie "Little Master" 
 Filmfare Award for Best Female Playback Singer - Kannada (2015) for "Chanana Chanana" from the movie Ugramm
 RED FM Tulu Film Awards Best Female Playback Singer - Tulu (2016) for "Mahamaye" from the movie Chaali Polilu
 Filmfare Award for Best Female Playback Singer - Kannada (2018) for "Appa I love you" from the movie Chowka
 SIIMA Award for Best Female Playback Singer - Kannada for "Appa I love you" from the movie Chowka
 Filmfare Award for Best Female Playback Singer – Kannada (2022) for "Dheera Sammohagaara" from the movie Bicchugatti
Nominations
 Filmfare Award for Best Female Playback Singer – Kannada (2013) for "Ellello Oduva Manase (Female)" from the movie Sidlingu
 Filmfare Award for Best Female Playback Singer – Kannada (2014) for "Srikrishna" from the movie Bhajarangi
 SIIMA Award for Best Female Playback Singer - Kannada (2015) for "Neenu Iruvaga" from the movie Ninnindale
 Filmfare Award for Best Female Playback Singer – Kannada (2016) for "Irali Hege" from the movie Benkipatna
 Filmfare Award for Best Female Playback Singer – Kannada (2017) for "Yavoora Geleya" from the movie Ricky
 Filmfare Award for Best Female Playback Singer - Kannada (2019) for "Holeva Holeyachege (Slow)" from the movie Ammachi Yemba Nenapu
 Chandanavana Film Critics Award for Best Female Singer (2020) for "Elliruve Hariye" from the movie Kurukshetra
 Chandanavana Film Critics Award for Best Female Singer (2020-2021) for "Dheera Sammohagaara" from the movie Bicchugatti

Television

References

External links
 

Indian women playback singers
Kannada playback singers
Living people
Musicians from Mangalore
Year of birth missing (living people)
Singers from Karnataka
Film musicians from Karnataka
21st-century Indian women singers
21st-century Indian singers
Women musicians from Karnataka